The Fédération Française des éclaireuses (FFE) is a Girl Guiding movement, created in 1921 and dissolved in 1964. FFE was a founding member of the Fédération du scoutisme français in 1940.

Whereas in France the various Scouting associations were created by religious denomination, the FFE was the only large-scale attempt to create an interdenominational movement. In 1921, it consisted of a neutral section, secular, and a unionist Protestant section. 1928, a Jewish section was integrated. From 1938, it also had a free Catholic section and an unofficial Muslim section in French Algeria.

When the federation self-dissolved in 1964, its different sections joined their male counterparts: the neutral section merged with the Éclaireurs français and Éclaireurs de France to form the Éclaireuses et éclaireurs de France in 1964; the Jewish section merged with the Eclaireurs israélites de France to form the Eclaireuses et Eclaireurs israélites de France in 1969; the unionist Protestant section merged with the Éclaireurs unionistes de France to form the Éclaireuses et Éclaireurs unionistes de France in 1970.

World Association of Girl Guides and Girl Scouts member organizations
World Organization of the Scout Movement member organizations
Scouting and Guiding in France
Youth organizations established in 1921